Halton was a federal electoral district in Ontario, Canada, represented in the House of Commons of Canada from 1867 to 1988 before being abolished in an electoral district redistribution, and again from 1997 to 2015, when it was again abolished in another electoral district redistribution. When it was last contested in 2011, its population was 203,437, of whom 115,255 were eligible electors.

Electoral district

1867–1966
Halton riding was created by the British North America Act, 1867, and defined as Halton County.

1966–1976
In 1966, the riding was redefined to consist of the Towns of Milton and Oakville and the Township of Esquesing in the County of Halton, and the Township of Erin in the County of Wellington.

1976–1987
In 1976, it was redefined to consist of the Towns of Milton and Oakville, and the southern part of the Town of Halton Hills.

The electoral district was abolished in 1987 when it was redistributed between Halton—Peel and Oakville—Milton ridings.

1996–2015
In 1996, the riding was re-created to include the Town of Milton and the northern parts of the Town of Oakville and the City of Burlington, defined as:
the Town of Milton,
the part of the Town of Oakville lying northwest of a line drawn from northeast to southwest along Dundas Street West, southeaster along Eighth Line, and southwest along Upper Middle Road, and
the part of the City of Burlington lying northwest of a line drawn from northeast to southwest along the Queen Elizabeth Way, northwest along Walkers Line, southwest along Upper Middle Road, northwest along Guelph Line, and southwest along Dundas Street.

In 2015, the riding of Halton was abolished and redistributed between Milton, Oakville North—Burlington, Burlington, Mississauga—Streetsville and Mississauga—Erin Mills.

Members of Parliament

This riding elected the following Members of Parliament:

Election results

1997–2015

			

Note: Conservative vote is compared to the total of the Canadian Alliance vote and Progressive Conservative vote in 2000 election.

Note: Canadian Alliance vote is compared to the Reform vote in 1997 election.

1867–1988

				

				

					

				

Note: NDP vote is compared to CCF vote in 1958 election.
					

			

			

Note: Progressive Conservative vote is compared to "National Government" vote in 1940 election.

Note: "National Government" vote is compared to Conservative vote in 1935 election.
					

		
		

						

Note: Conservative vote is compared to Government vote in 1917 election, and Liberal vote is compared to Opposition vote.

Note: Government vote is compared to Conservative vote in 1911 election, and Opposition vote is compared to Liberal vote.
	

	

				

	

Note: indicates change in popular vote from to 1891 general election.

				

	

On Mr. Chisholm being unseated, on petition, 8 December 1874:

See also
 List of Canadian federal electoral districts
 Past Canadian electoral districts

References

Federal riding history 1867–1987 from the Library of Parliament
Federal riding history 1997–2008 from the Library of Parliament
2011 Results from Elections Canada
 Campaign expense data from Elections Canada

Notes

Milton, Ontario
Politics of Burlington, Ontario
Politics of Oakville, Ontario
Former federal electoral districts of Ontario